Al Dhaferah is an amphibious transport ship in service with the Royal Navy of Oman since her construction in 1987. The vessel is capable of transporting 240 troops, but now works alongside the royal yacht.

The vessel was previously named Fulk Al Salamah, but was renamed Al Dhaferah in 2016 after the delivery of the new Fulk Al Salamah.

References

External links 
 Image of the ship

1986 ships
Amphibious warfare vessels of the Royal Navy of Oman
Naval ships of Oman
Ships built in Bremen (state)